Sympycnus is a genus of flies in the family Dolichopodidae.

Species
Subgenus Sympycnus Loew, 1857:

Subgenus Subsympycnus Becker, 1922:
 Sympycnus griseicollis (Becker, 1922)

The following are synonyms of other species:
 Sympycnus annulipes (Meigen, 1824): Synonym of Sympycnus pulicarius (Fallen, 1823)
 Sympycnus annulipes var. brunnitibialis Santos Abreu, 1929: Synonym of Sympycnus pulicarius (Fallen, 1823)
 Sympycnus cinerellus (Zetterstedt, 1838): Synonym of Sympycnus pulicarius (Fallen, 1823)
 Sympycnus desoutteri Parent, 1925: Synonym of Sympycnus pulicarius (Fallen, 1823)
 Sympycnus pygmaeus (Macquart, 1827): Synonym of Sympycnus pulicarius (Fallen, 1823)

References

Europe
Nearctic

Dolichopodidae genera
Sympycninae
Articles containing video clips
Taxa named by Hermann Loew